The Encyclopedia of Genetics is a print encyclopedia of genetics edited by Sydney Brenner and Jeffrey H. Miller. It has four volumes and 1,700 entries. It is available online at http://www.sciencedirect.com/science/referenceworks/9780122270802.

Genetics
Genetics literature